Dronningens gate ("Queen's Street") is the name of two rail stations in Norway:

Dronningens gate (station, Oslo)
Dronningens gate (station, Trondheim)